Isotomiella is a genus of springtails (Collembola) in the family Isotomidae.

Species

Isotomiella alulu Christiansen & Bellinger, 1992
Isotomiella aluluminor Yoshii, 1995
Isotomiella amazonica Oliveira & Deharveng, 1990
Isotomiella annae Deharveng & Suhardjono, 1994
Isotomiella arlei Oliveira & Deharveng, 1990
Isotomiella barisan Deharveng & Suhardjono, 1994
Isotomiella barivierai Deharveng, 1989
Isotomiella barrai Deharveng & Oliveira, 1990
Isotomiella barrana Mendonça & Abrantes, 2007
Isotomiella bidentata Delamare Deboutteville, 1950
Isotomiella brevidens Bedos & Deharveng, 1994
Isotomiella canina Mendonça & Fernandes, 2003
Isotomiella ciliata Cardoso, 1969
Isotomiella cribrata Deharveng & Suhardjono, 1994
Isotomiella deforestai Deharveng & Suhardjono, 1994
Isotomiella delamarei Barra, 1968
Isotomiella digitata Deharveng & Oliveira, 1990
Isotomiella distincta Mendonça & Fernandes, 2003
Isotomiella dubia Deharveng & Suhardjono, 1994
Isotomiella dupliseta Deharveng & Oliveira, 1990
Isotomiella edaphica Bedos & Deharveng, 1994
Isotomiella falcata Mendonça & Fernandes, 2003
Isotomiella fellina Mendonça & Fernandes, 2003
Isotomiella gracilimucronata Rusek, 1981
Isotomiella granulata Oliveira & Deharveng, 1990
Isotomiella hirsuta Bedos & Deharveng, 1994
Isotomiella hygrophila Sterzyńska & Kapruś’, 2001
Isotomiella insulae Barra, 2006
Isotomiella inthanonensis Bedos & Deharveng, 1994
Isotomiella leksawasdii Bedos & Deharveng, 1994
Isotomiella madeirensis Gama, 1959
Isotomiella michonae Deharveng & Suhardjono, 1994
Isotomiella minor (Schäffer, 1896)
Isotomiella muscorum (Schäffer, 1900)
Isotomiella nummulifer Deharveng & Oliveira, 1990
Isotomiella paraminor Gisin, 1942
Isotomiella proxima Mendonça & Fernandes, 2003
Isotomiella quadriseta Deharveng & Oliveira, 1990
Isotomiella sensillata Oliveira & Deharveng, 1990
Isotomiella similis Oliveira & Deharveng, 1990
Isotomiella sodwana Barra, 1997
Isotomiella spinifer Deharveng & Oliveira, 1990
Isotomiella spinosa Deharveng & Fjellberg, 1993
Isotomiella symetrimucronata Najt & Thibaud, 1987
Isotomiella thiollayi Deharveng & Suhardjono, 1994
Isotomiella unguiculata Deharveng, 1989

References

Entomobryomorpha
springtail genera